Bingley Glacier is a glacier  long in the Queen Alexandra Range, draining south from the slopes of Mount Kirkpatrick, Mount Dickerson and Barnes Peak and entering Beardmore Glacier just north of the Adams Mountains. It was named by Ernest Shackleton of the British Antarctic Expedition, 1907–09, after Bingley, England, the ancestral home of the Shackleton family.

References 

Glaciers of the Ross Dependency
Shackleton Coast